Charles Frederick Laxton (9 April 1890 – 11 January 1964) was an Australian rules footballer who played for Collingwood in the VFL.

Family
He was the younger brother of Harry Laxton and the son-in-law of Jack Roberts.

Football
Laxton was a member of Collingwood premiership teams in 1917 and 1919. He also played in three losing Grand Finals. A rover who liked the stab pass, Laxton was a Victorian interstate representative in 1919 and 1920.

Death
He died on 11 January 1964.

Footnotes

References
Holmesby, Russell and Main, Jim (2007). The Encyclopedia of AFL Footballers. 7th ed. Melbourne: Bas Publishing.

External links

1890 births
1964 deaths
Australian rules footballers from Melbourne
Australian Rules footballers: place kick exponents
Collingwood Football Club players
Collingwood Football Club Premiership players
Two-time VFL/AFL Premiership players